Israel competed at the 2015 European Games, in Baku, Azerbaijan from 12 to 28 June 2015. The 2015 European Games represents Israel's largest ever delegation to a sports competition. Prior to the start of the event Israel planned to send 141 athletes to the games.

Winners of Olympic competitions such as triathlon, table tennis and shooting competitions will automatically qualify for the 2016 Summer Olympics. Israel will also participate in three of the five non-Olympic events, including 3×3 basketball and the sambo.

Israel finished the games with 12 medals in total and 2 athletes qualifying for the 2016 Summer Olympics.

TV broadcasting
International Sports Broadcasting (ISB) will be the host broadcaster of the European Games. During the Games, ISB will produce approximately 6 hours of coverage per day. In Israel the games were broadcast on Sport 5 and Sport 1.

Medalists

At the closing of the games Israel had won twelve medals, two gold, four silver and six bronze, ranking them 22nd overall.

Competitors
The Israeli delegation included 134 athletes competing in 20 sports.

Archery

Athletics

In total Israel is sending 43 people to compete in Athletics competitions. This includes 23 men and 20 women.

At the conclusion of each event points were added to a nation's total based on the competitors placement. Points were combined to produce national team totals, and games medals were awarded to the top three nations. Medals were not awarded for individual events. At the conclusion of the 40 athletic events, Israel accumulated 430 total points, giving them the bronze medal.

Badminton

Men

Basketball 3×3

Basketball at the 2015 European games took place in the half-court 3x3 format.

Beach volleyball

Boxing

Cycling

Mountain Bike

Road Cycling

Fencing

Gymnastics

Acrobatic

Women's groups

Artistic

Men
All-Around

Apparatus

Women
All-Around

Rhythmic
Israel has qualified two athletes after their performance at the 2013 Rhythmic Gymnastics European Championships.

Judo

Sambo

Shooting

Swimming

On 24 June, Israeli swimmer Marc Hinawi became the first Israel to win a medal in swimming at the European games (8th overall), winning the bronze medal in 1,500 metre free style.

Synchronised Swimming

Taekwondo

Triathlon

Water Polo

Wrestling

References

Nations at the 2015 European Games
European Games
2015